Band of Robbers is a 2015 American independent crime comedy film written and directed by brothers Aaron and Adam Nee, based on Mark Twain's The Adventures of Tom Sawyer and Adventures of Huckleberry Finn. In this modern-day retelling, the two iconic rascals are grown up and small-time crooks still searching for the fabled Murrell's treasure that has eluded them since childhood. The story draws heavily from Twain's classic novels, including characters, plot twists and even dialogue.

Plot 
When Huck Finn is released from jail he is greeted by his lifelong friend, Tom Sawyer, now an underachieving cop who just can't let go of their childhood dreams of wealth and glory. Tom convinces the reluctant Huck and their bumbling friends Joe Harper and Ben Rogers to rob a pawnshop where their friend and contact, the alcoholic vagrant Muff Potter, believes Injun Joe, a savage and murderous white career criminal who admires and appropriates Native American culture, has hidden Murrell's treasure. Tom explains that robbing bad guys makes them the good guys. Things get complicated when Tom's commander assigns him to train Becky Thatcher, an eager-to-please rookie partner, and the hung-over band of robbers' heist goes awry. But that doesn't stop Tom; instead, he leads the band on a wild treasure hunt from one mysterious clue to another. When Huck's friend, Mexican day laborer Jorge Jimenez, is mistaken as part of the band's activities and arrested, Huck and Tom, on the run from a vengeful Injun Joe and the police, lead the band on a mission to rescue him and be "heroes".

Cast 
 Kyle Gallner as Huck Finn
 Gabriel Bateman as Young Huck
 Adam Nee as Tom Sawyer
 Willem Miller as Young Tom
 Matthew Gray Gubler as Joe Harper
 Hannibal Buress as Ben Rogers
 Melissa Benoist as Officer Becky Thatcher
 Daniel Edward Mora as Jorge Jimenez aka Jim
 Stephen Lang as Injun Joe
 Eric Christian Olsen as Det. Sid Sawyer
 Johnny Pemberton as Tommy Barnes
 Beth Grant as Widow Douglas
 Cooper Huckabee as Muff Potter
 Lee Garlington as Lt. Polly
 Creed Bratton as Dobbins
 Josh Harp as Packard
 Jack Wallace as Doc Robinson
 Maria Blasucci as Amy Lawrence
 Brian Sacca as Det. Temple
 Jeff Newburg as Pap Finn

Release
Band of Robbers was picked up for distribution by Gravitas Ventures and had a limited release on January 15, 2016 in theaters in 11 cities.

Reception 
Band of Robbers received generally positive reviews from The New York Times,  Variety, and The Cleveland Plain Dealer. On review aggregator Rotten Tomatoes, the film holds an approval rating of 78% based on 27 reviews, with an average rating of 6.51/10. It has drawn comparisons to the films of Wes Anderson, particularly Bottle Rocket, and the Coen brothers.

It won the Director's Choice Award at the Naples International Film Festival.

References

External links 
 
 

2015 films
2015 comedy films
2015 crime films
2015 independent films
2010s crime comedy films
2010s English-language films
2010s heist films
2010s police comedy films
American crime comedy films
American heist films
American independent films
Films based on Adventures of Huckleberry Finn
Films based on The Adventures of Tom Sawyer
Films based on multiple works of a series
Films directed by Aaron and Adam Nee
Films scored by Joel P. West
Films with screenplays by Aaron and Adam Nee
2010s American films
English-language crime comedy films